Southwind Vineyard & Winery is a winery in Deerfield Township (mailing address is Millville) in Cumberland County, New Jersey. A family horse farm since 1978, the vineyard was first planted in 2006, and opened to the public in 2012. Southwind has 4 acres of grapes under cultivation, and produces 800 cases of wine per year. The winery's name reflects the Southern origin of the farm's original owners, and their desire to provide Southern hospitality.

Wines
Southwind Vineyard is located in the Outer Coastal Plain AVA, and produces wine from  Cabernet Franc, Cabernet Sauvignon, Chambourcin, Chardonnay, Concord, Malbec, Merlot, Muscat blanc, and Viognier grapes. Southwind also makes fruit wines from limes and peaches.

Features, licensing, and associations
The winery offers horse boarding and hunter pacing, and specializes in the use of Lippizan horses. Southwind has a plenary winery license from the New Jersey Division of Alcoholic Beverage Control, which allows it to produce an unrestricted amount of wine, operate up to 15 off-premises sales rooms, and ship up to 12 cases per year to consumers in-state or out-of-state. The winery is a member of the Garden State Wine Growers Association and the Outer Coastal Plain Vineyard Association.

See also 
Alcohol laws of New Jersey
American wine
Judgment of Princeton
List of wineries, breweries, and distilleries in New Jersey
New Jersey Farm Winery Act
New Jersey Wine Industry Advisory Council
New Jersey wine

References

External links 
Garden State Wine Growers Association
Outer Coastal Plain Vineyard Association

Wineries in New Jersey
Tourist attractions in Cumberland County, New Jersey
2012 establishments in New Jersey
Deerfield Township, New Jersey